Leon (branded as LEON.) is a fast food chain based in the United Kingdom, established in 2004. The company had around 70 outlets when it was bought by EG Group in 2021.

History
Leon was founded by John Vincent and Henry Dimbleby with chef Allegra McEvedy. The business was named after Vincent's father, and opened its first outlet in Carnaby Street in 2004. Six months after opening, Leon was named the "Best New Restaurant in Great Britain" at The Observer Food Monthly Awards.

In 2008, Leon became a founding member of the Sustainable Restaurant Association.

In March 2009, McEvedy gave up her role at Leon to focus on writing and television work, but remains a shareholder. In 2014, John Vincent took over from Henry Dimbleby as CEO, and Dimbleby then left the board in 2017. He also remains a shareholder.

By 2015 Leon had 57 restaurants. In January 2015, HMSHost operated six Leon locations in airports and railway stations in southern England, and Leon announced an expansion of its relationship with HMSHost in 2018, including a franchise agreement in airports and railway stations across Europe and the Middle East. The company hoped to reach an international clientele through these outlets, and help create demand ahead of further overseas openings.

In June 2016 the first Leon outside England opened in Amsterdam. Other overseas openings followed, including restaurants at Utrecht, Oslo, Gran Canaria, Dublin and Leon's first restaurant in the United States, in Washington, D.C. The latter's style was described as "fast-casual Mediterranean" in the local press.

The chain was named in the 2017 The Sunday Times Fast Track 100 list. Leon was backed by Active Private Equity and, in May 2017, Spice Private Equity became a major investor to support further global expansion plans.

By 2018, the company had 61 sites. In the first quarter of 2019, 53% of the chain's food sales were plant-based or vegetarian.

In March 2020, Leon set up the "Feed NHS" initiative to deliver 5,600 free meals a day to National Health Service critical care staff at London hospitals during the COVID-19 pandemic. Other restaurant chains became involved, including Franco Manca, Tortilla, Tossed, and Wasabi. A JustGiving page was created to raise funds.

Leon USA Inc. filed for liquidation in February 2021, citing low customer numbers because of the Covid-19 pandemic. It had three outlets in Washington and a fourth nearby in Fairfax, Virginia.

Purchase by EG Group 
In April 2021, the company was sold for a reported £100million to the Issa brothers' EG Group, which also operates fast food franchises and had recently agreed to buy the Asda supermarket business. At that time, Leon had 71 outlets, of which 42 were operated by the company; the other 29 were franchises at transport hubs, in the UK and five other European countries.

Other activities 
Leon has published several cookbooks, and developed a cookware and tableware line with retailer John Lewis.

Policies 
In the United Kingdom, Leon implements equal pay, for both age and gender. The company pays the over 25s rate of the minimum wage to all hourly paid employees, including those aged below 25.

References

External links
 

2004 establishments in England
British brands
Fast-food chains of the United Kingdom
Restaurant groups in the United Kingdom
Restaurants established in 2004
Restaurants in London
2021 mergers and acquisitions
Companies that have filed for Chapter 7 bankruptcy